Loud 'n' Raw is the fourth live album by the Japanese band Loudness. It was released in 1995 only in Japan. "Speed King" is a cover of the Deep Purple's song from the album Deep Purple in Rock.

Track listing
"Desperation Desecration" (Akira Takasaki, Masaki Yamada, Stephan Galfas) - 7:12
"Pray for the Dead" (Takasaki, Yamada, Jody Gray) - 5:02
"Down 'n' Dirty" (Takasaki, Mike Vescera) - 7:28
"222" (Takasaki) - 3:10
"Eyes of a Child" (Takasaki, Yamada, Galfas) - 12:57
"Howling Rain" (Takasaki, Yamada, Galfas) - 9:51
"Paralyzed" (Takasaki, Yamada, Galfas) - 6:18
"Speed King" (Ritchie Blackmore, Ian Gillan, Roger Glover, Jon Lord, Ian Paice) - 6:39
"S.D.I." (Takasaki, Minoru Niihara) - 5:24

"Hidden" bonus track for initial 1st pressing only
"Freedom"

Personnel
Loudness
Masaki Yamada - vocals
Akira Takasaki - guitars
Naoto Shibata - bass
Hirotsugu Homma - drums

Production
Kaz Sumida, Nobuyoshi Araki - engineers
Takahiro Sakai - mixing
Ryuichi Tanaka - mastering

References

1993 live albums
Loudness (band) live albums
Warner Music Group live albums